Jacob II or Jakob II may refer to:
Jacob II of Cilicia
Jakob II Bernoulli
Jakob von Baden, also known as Jakob II

See also
James II (disambiguation)